From 22 September 1792 to 2 November 1795, the French Republic was governed by the National Convention, whose president (elected from within for a 14-day term) may be considered as France's legitimate head of state during this period. Historians generally divide the Convention's activities into three periods, moderate, radical, and reaction, and the policies of presidents of the Convention reflect these distinctions. During the radical and reaction phases, some of the presidents were executed, most by guillotine, committed suicide, or were deported. In addition, some of the presidents were later deported during the Bourbon Restoration in 1815.

Establishment of the Convention
The National Convention governed France from 20 September 1792 until 26 October 1795 during the most critical period of the French Revolution. The election of the National Convention took place in September 1792 after the election of the electoral colleges by primary regional assemblies on 26 August. Owing to the abstention of aristocrats and the anti-republicans, and the general fear of victimization, the voter turnout in the departments was low – as little as 7.5 percent or as much as 11.9% of the electorate, compared to 10.2% in the 1791 elections, despite the doubling of the number of eligible voters.

Initially elected to provide a new constitution after the overthrow of the monarchy on 10 August 1792, the Convention included 749 deputies drawn from businesses and trades, and from such professions as law, journalism, medicine, and the clergy. Among its earliest acts was the formal abolition of the monarchy, through Proclamation, on 21 September, and the subsequent establishment of the Republic on 22 September. The French Republican Calendar discarded all Christian reference points and calculated time from the Republic's first full day after the monarchy – 22 September 1792, the first day of Year One.

According to its own rules, the Convention elected its president every fortnight (two weeks). He was eligible for re-election after the lapse of a fortnight. Ordinarily the sessions were held in the morning, but evening sessions also occurred frequently, often extending late into the night. In exceptional circumstances, the Convention declared itself in permanent session and sat for several days without interruption. For both legislative and administrative deliberations, the Convention used committees, with powers more or less widely extended and regulated by successive laws. The most famous of these committees included the Committee of Public Safety and the Committee of General Security.

The Convention held both legislative and executive powers during the first years of the French First Republic and had three distinct periods: Girondins (moderate), Montagnard (radical) and Thermidorian (reaction).  The Montagnards favored granting the poorer classes more political power; the Girondins favored a bourgeois republic and wanted to reduce the power and influence of Paris over the course of the revolution.  A popular uprising in Paris helped to purge the Convention of the Girondins between 31 May and 2 June 1793;  the last of the Girondins served as presidents in late July.

In its second phase, the Montagnards controlled the convention (June 1793 to July 1794). War and an internal rebellion convinced the revolutionary government to establish a Committee of Public Safety which exercised near dictatorial power. Consequently, the democratic constitution, approved by the convention on 24 June 1793, did not go into effect and the Convention lost its legislative initiative. The rise of Mountaineers (Montagnards) corresponded with the decline of the Girondins. The Girondin party had hesitated on the correct course of action to take with Louis XVI after his attempt to flee France on 20 June 1791. Some elements of the Girondin party believed they could use the king as figurehead. While the Girondins hesitated, the Montagnards took a united stand during the trial in December 1792 – January 1793 and favored the king’s execution. Riding on this victory, the Montagnards then sought to discredit the Girondins using tactics previously used against themselves, denouncing the Girondins as liars and enemies of the Revolution. The last quarter of the year was marked by the Reign of Terror (5 September 1793 – 28 July 1794), also known as The Terror, a period of violence incited by conflict between these rival political factions, the Girondins and the Jacobins, and marked by mass executions of "enemies of the revolution". The death toll ranged in the tens of thousands, with 16,594 executed by guillotine (2,639 in Paris), and another 25,000 in summary executions across France.  Most of the Parisian victims of the guillotine filled the Madeleine, Mosseaux (also called Errancis), and Picpus cemeteries.

In the third phase, called Thermidor after the month in which it began, many of the members of the Convention overthrew the most prominent member of the committee, Maximilien Robespiere.  This reaction to the radical influence of the Committee of Public Safety reestablished the balance of power in the hands of the moderate deputies.  The Girondins who had survived the 1793 purge were recalled and the leading Montagnards were themselves purged, and many executed.  In August 1795, the Convention approved the Constitution for the regime that replaced it, the bourgeois-dominated Directory, which exercised power from 1795 to 1799, when a coup d'etat by Napoleon Bonaparte overthrew it.

Moderate phase: September 1792 – June 1793

Initially, La Marais, or The Plain, a moderate, amorphous group, controlled the Convention.  At the first session, held on 20 September 1792, the elder statesman Philippe Rühl presided over the session. The following day, amidst profound silence, the proposition was put to the assembly, "That royalty be abolished in France"; it carried, with cheers. On the 22nd came the news of the Republic's victory at the Battle of Valmy. On the same day, the Convention decreed that "in future, the acts of the assembly shall be dated First Year of the French Republic". Three days later, the Convention added the corollary of "the French republic is one and indivisible", to guard against federalism.

The following men were elected for two-week terms as presidents, or executives, of the Convention.

At the end of May 1793, an uprising of the Parisian sans culottes, the day-laborers and working class, undermined much of the authority of the moderate Girondins.  At this point, although Danton and Hérault de Séchelles both served one more term each as Presidents of the Convention, the Girondins had lost control of the Convention: in June and July compromise after compromise changed the course of the revolution from a bourgeois event to a radical, working class event. Price controls were introduced and a minimum wage guaranteed to workers and soldiers. Over the course of the summer, the government became truly revolutionary.

Radical phase: June 1793 – July 1794

After the insurrection, any attempted resistance to revolutionary ideals was crushed. The insurrection of 31 May – 2 June 1793 marked a significant milestone in the history of the French Revolution. The days of 31 May – 2 June resulted in the fall of the Girondin party under pressure of the Parisian sans-culottes, Jacobins of the clubs, and Montagnards in the National Convention. The following men were elected as presidents of the Convention during its transition from its moderate to radical phase.

The following men were elected as presidents of the Convention during its radical phase.

Reaction: July 1794–1795

On 27 July 1794, the National Convention voted for the arrest of Maximilien Robespierre, Louis Antoine de Saint-Just, and several allies, and they were executed the following day. This ended the most radical phase of the French Revolution.

The following men were presidents of the Convention until its end.

Successor organization
The Directory was the government of France following the collapse of the National Convention in late 1795.  Administered by a collective leadership of five directors, it preceded the Consulate established in a coup d'etat by Napoleon. It lasted from 2 November 1795 until 10 November 1799, a period commonly known as the "Directory era". The directory operated with a bicameral structure. A Council of the Ancients, selected by lot, named the directors. For its own security, the Left (whose members dominated the Council) resolved that all five must be old members of the Convention and regicides who had voted to execute King Louis XVI. The Ancients chose Jean-François Rewbell; Paul François Jean Nicolas, vicomte de Barras; Louis Marie de La Révellière-Lépeaux; Lazare Nicolas Marguerite Carnot; and Étienne-François Le Tourneur.

See also
Ministers of the French National Convention
Representative on mission
Full list of members of the Convention per department: List of Members of the National Convention by Department (French)

Notes, citations and sources

Notes

Citations

Sources
 Editors, "National Convention" and "Reign of Terror." The Encyclopædia Britannica, 2015, Accessed 22 April 2014.
 Alderson, Robert. This Bright Era of Happy Revolutions: French Consul.  U. of South Carolina Press, 2008. 
 Doyle, William. The Oxford History of the French Revolution. 2nd edition. Oxford University Press, 2002.  
 Cheynet, Pierre-Dominique.  France: Members of the Executive Directory: 1792–1793, and 1793–1795. Archontology.org 2013, Accessed 19 February 2015.
  Dupuy, Roger. La République jacobine. Terreur, guerre et gouvernement révolutionnaire (1792—1794). Paris, Le Seuil, 2005.  
 Furet, François.  The French Revolution: 1770–1814. Oxford, Blackwell Publishers Ltd, 1996.  
 Fleischmann, Hector, Behind the Scenes in the Terror, NY, Brentano's, 1915.  
 Garnier, Jean-Claude; Jean-Pierre Mohen. Cimetières autour du monde: Un désir d'éternité. Paris, Editions Errance. 2003.  
 Greer, Donald. The Incidence of the Terror during the French Revolution: A Statistical Interpretation. Cambridge (United States C.A), Harvard University Press, 1951. 
 Linton, Marisa. Choosing Terror: Virtue, Friendship, and Authenticity in the French Revolution Oxford U.P., 2013. 
 Neeley, Sylvia.  A Concise History of the French Revolution, Lanham, Rowman & Littlefield, 2008. 
 Popkin, Jeremy D.  A Short History of the French Revolution. 5th ed. Upper Saddle River, Pearson, 2009. 
 Smitha, Frank E. Macrohistory: Fear, Overreaction and War (1792–93). 2009–2015 version. Accessed 21 April 2015.
 Thompson, J.M. The French Revolution. Oxford, Basil Blackwell, 1959. 

France
Heads of state of France
Lists of legislative speakers